Scott Parel (born May 15, 1965) is an American professional golfer.

Parel was born in Pontiac, Michigan. He graduated from the University of Georgia but did not play college golf. He worked for 10 years as a computer programmer and database administrator after college before becoming a professional golfer.

Parel played on the Web.com Tour in 2003, 2005–09, and 2012–15. He won his first title at the 2013 Air Capital Classic.

Parel has played only five PGA Tour events, making the cut only once, a T-57 at 2006 BellSouth Classic. He qualified for the U.S. Open twice, in 2002 and 2005.

In August 2018, Parel won on the PGA Tour Champions by winning the Boeing Classic.

In October 2018, Parel won for the second time on the PGA Tour Champions, winning the Invesco QQQ Championship at Sherwood Country Club in Lake Sherwood, California.

In November 2018, Parel finished third in the season-long Charles Schwab Cup, earning a $300,000 bonus.

On April 1, 2019, Parel lost a seven-hole playoff at the Rapiscan Systems Classic in Mississippi to Kevin Sutherland. The playoff was held over two days because play had to be suspended on Sunday March 31, 2019 due to darkness.
Sutherland and Parel faced off in a playoff again in June 2019 at the Principal Charity Classic with Sutherland winning on the second extra hole.

In February 2020, Parel overcame a three-shot deficit Sunday and closed with an 8-under 63 to win the Chubb Classic by two shots over Bob Estes, his third career victory on the PGA Tour Champions to surpass $5 million for his career.

Professional wins (6)

Web.com Tour wins (1)

Web.com Tour playoff record (0–1)

PGA Tour Champions wins (4)

PGA Tour Champions playoff record (1–3)

Other wins (1)
2018 Diamond Resorts Invitational

Results in major championships

CUT = missed the halfway cut
Note: Parel only played in the U.S. Open.

Results in senior major championships
Results not in chronological order before 2022.

"T" indicates a tie for a place
NT = No tournament due to COVID-19 pandemic

References

External links

American male golfers
PGA Tour golfers
PGA Tour Champions golfers
Golfers from Michigan
Golfers from Augusta, Georgia
University of Georgia alumni
Sportspeople from Pontiac, Michigan
1965 births
Living people